Musharraf Karim (9 January 1946 – 11 January 2020) was a Bangladeshi writer and journalist. He was conferred with the Bangla Academy Literary Award in 2003 for his contribution to juvenile literature. He was a fellow of Bangla Academy too.

Early life
Karim was born on 9 January 1946 in Mymensingh to M. A. Karim and Amina Khatun. His ancestors' house was situated at Khairati under Ishwarganj in Mymensingh. He passed matriculation from Edward Institution, Mymensingh in 1964. Later, he got admitted into Nasirabad College, Mymensingh. He completed higher secondary studies from there in 1967. He also graduated from there in 1972. Later, he got admitted into Ananda Mohan College. He completed his post graduate studies in Bangla from there in 1974. He took part in the movements against Ayub Khan in the sixties.

Career
Khan was the news editor of the Daily Dinkal. He was a permanent member of the Jatiya Press Club. He also served as the director of Tribal Cultural Academy.

Khan was involved in writing books too. He was also conferred with Bangla Academy Literary Award in 2003 for his contribution in juvenile literature. He was a fellow of Bangla Academy.

Death
Khan died on 11 January 2020 at a private hospital in Mymensingh at the age of 74.

Selected bibliography

Poetry
 Pathorer Pothe
 Onyo Ek Adibase
 Se Noy Sundori Shirin
 Kothay Se Dirgho Debdaru
 Nibedoner Gondhodhala
 Ontorer Byakul Byadhi
 Ke Achhe, Keu Ki Achhe
 Nirbachito Kobita
 Ghaser Dogay Holud Foring

Novel
 Purbopurushgon
 Prothom Brishti
 Swapnokabyo
 Uponyastroyi

Juvenile literature
 Kokakaka
 Lebendish
 Chhokka Mamar Galgolpo
 Bogus Bhoot
 Gu For Natin
 Neelganjer Bhoot
 Tom Sahebrr Odvut Bari
 Nijhumpurer Porobari
 Choraguhar Rohosyo
 Voyongkor Chheledhora
 Kishor Uponyas Somogro

References

External links

1946 births
2020 deaths
People from Mymensingh District
Bangladeshi male novelists
Bangladeshi male poets
Bangladeshi journalists
Recipients of Bangla Academy Award
Honorary Fellows of Bangla Academy